Las Lajas Canton is a canton of Ecuador, located in the El Oro Province.  Its capital is the town of La Victoria.  Its population at the 2001 census was 4,781.

Demographics
Ethnic groups as of the Ecuadorian census of 2010:
Mestizo  88.0%
White  4.7%
Afro-Ecuadorian  3.9%
Montubio  3.0%
Indigenous  0.1%
Other  0.3%

References

Cantons of El Oro Province